The MacGregor 24 is an American trailerable sailboat that was designed by Roger MacGregor and first built in 1971.

Production
The design was built by the MacGregor Yacht Corporation in the United States, but it is now out of production.

Design

The MacGregor 24 is a small recreational keelboat, built predominantly of fiberglass, with wood trim. It has a fractional sloop, a raked stem, a vertical transom, a transom-hung rudder controlled by a tiller and a retractable centerboard type keel. It displaces  and carries  of ballast.

The boat is normally fitted with a small outboard motor for docking and maneuvering.

See also
List of sailing boat types

Similar sailboats
Achilles 24
Atlantic City catboat
Balboa 24
C&C 24
C&C SR 25
Challenger 24
Columbia 24
Islander 24
Islander 24 Bahama
Mirage 24
Nutmeg 24
San Juan 24
Seidelmann 245
Shark 24
Tonic 23

References

External links

Keelboats
1970s sailboat type designs
Sailing yachts
Trailer sailers
Sailboat type designs by Roger MacGregor
Sailboat types built by the MacGregor Yacht Corporation